is a professional Japanese baseball player. He plays infielder for the Yokohama DeNA BayStars. Between 2009 and 2017 he played for the Tohoku Rakuten Golden Eagles.

References 

1990 births
Living people
Baseball people from Aichi Prefecture
Japanese expatriate baseball players in Australia
Nippon Professional Baseball infielders
Tohoku Rakuten Golden Eagles players
Yokohama DeNA BayStars players
Perth Heat players